Bouère is a commune in the Mayenne department in northwestern France.

Geography

Local quarries supplied a proportion of the marble used in the construction of the Basilica of the Sacré Cœur and Saint-Lazare railway station in Paris.

Administration
List of successive mayors

Population

Sights
 Romanesque church (11th/12th century restored in the 19th century)
 Communal cemetery (registered with the additional inventory of the historic buildings)
 Votive vault 1871
 Castle of Bois-Jourdan 16th/17th century and dependences
 Castle of the Vézousière 18th century
 Castle of Rochers 19th century
 Castle of the Sevaudière 19th century
 Castle of Daviers 19th century

Personalities
 Urbain Grandier

See also
Communes of Mayenne

References

Communes of Mayenne